Richard "Richie" Coren (11 August 1954 – 31 March 2021) was an American bridge player. He died in March 2021 from Crohn's disease.

Bridge accomplishments

Wins

 North American Bridge Championships (6)
 Reisinger (1) 2017 
 Norman Kay Platinum Pairs (1) 2014 
 Rockwell Mixed Pairs (1) 2014 
 Blue Ribbon Pairs (1) 2000 
 Grand National Teams (1) 2014 
 Keohane North American Swiss Teams (1) 2001

Runners-up
 North American Bridge Championships
 Grand National Teams (1) 2017

References

External links
 

American contract bridge players
1954 births
2021 deaths
Deaths from Crohn's disease